Orthophytum lemei is a plant species in the genus Orthophytum.

Cultivars
 Orthophytum 'Cabernet'
 Orthophytum 'Stardust'

References
BSI Cultivar Registry Retrieved 11 October 2009

lemei